Eutropis multicarinata is a species of skink found in the Philippines.

References

Eutropis
Reptiles described in 1845
Taxa named by John Edward Gray
Fauna of the Philippines